The Victorian School Building Authority (VSBA) is a division of the Victorian Department of Education which is responsible for the construction of new government schools and infrastructure improvements at existing schools. It was established by the Andrews Government as part of the 2016 Victorian Budget. 

Between 2017 and 2022 the Authority opened 69 new primary and secondary schools in the state and plans to open an additional 27 by 2024.

A number of the VSBA's new schools are so-called "vertical schools" on inner-city sites, a new concept in Victoria.

History 
During the 2014 Victorian state election, then Opposition Leader Daniel Andrews promised $1.3 billion for new schools and school upgrades. The School Building Authority was established as part of the 2016 state budget as part of a $1.1 billion school infrastructure package. This included $42 million to build and reopen Richmond High School, 22 years after the school was controversially closed by the government of Jeff Kennett. This came after research published by the Grattan Institute that found, due to the state's rapid population growth, Victorian schools would need to absorb an extra 190,000 students in the decade from 2016, requiring 7,200 new teachers and 140 to 220 new schools to be built. In 2017, Education Minister James Merlino said the state needed to absord an additional 90,000 students over the next five years.

The removal of trees for the construction of Beaumaris Secondary College caused controversy in 2016.

In the lead-up to the 2018 state election, Andrews announced the Authority would build 100 new schools over the next eight years in order to meet Melbourne's population growth, with 45 schools to be built over the next term of government. The schools would mainly be built in the city's growing outer suburbs at an additional cost of $850 million.

In July 2022, the state government released tenders for eleven new schools. In October 2022 during the 2022 state election, Andrews announced funding for a further 25 new state schools would be built in Victoria by 2026, with 90 schools upgraded or expanded, at a cost of $1.6 billion. This was to meet the government's commitment to build 100 new schools by 2026.

Architecture 

The scale of the school infrastructure program led the VSBA in 2017 to seek architects for its new schools, and for new permanent, modular classrooms for existing schools. A number of these classrooms were to replace existing buildings that contained asbestos. The Authority was tasked with replacing 100 of these buildings with prefabricated classrooms.

At certain inner-city locations, space was constrained, and the authority embarked on building "vertical school" campuses, a first for Melbourne. Richmond High School became the state's first vertical high school while South Melbourne Primary School was heralded as the state's first vertical primary school. Designed by Hayball, the  525 student South Melbourne Primary opened in 2018, serving the nearby rapidly growing inner-city areas of Southbank and Fisherman's Bend. The six-story campus sat on a half-acre site on Ferrars Street, adjacent to a new park built on land purchased by the state government and the City of Port Philip in 2017. The primary school would have no formal classrooms and instead would feature a combination of indoor and outdoor spaces and a central staircase for circulation, with the architect saying it represented a new approach to density for Melbourne. The project was named Future Project of the Year at the 2016 World Architecture Festival in Berlin.

Other inner-city schools like Prahran High School, which opened in 2019, were built as vertical schools. The 650-student school is four storeys tall and is designed by Gray Puksand. COX Architecture and McGregor Coxall designed the three-story campus for Docklands Primary School in the CBD-adjacent Docklands precinct.

Childcare centres 
In 2022, the Andrews Government announced that the VSBA would build 50 childcare centres across Victoria. Part of a major $9 billion expansion of state provision of childcare, the first four centres were planned to open by 2025 and are being colocated with existing primary or secondary schools.

List of new VSBA schools

References 

Government agencies of Victoria (Australia)
Education in Victoria (Australia)
2016 establishments in Australia
School buildings
Government agencies established in 2016